The Indian locomotive class WCP-2 is a class of 1.5 kV DC electric locomotives that was developed in late 1920s by Swiss Locomotive and Machine Works (SLM) for Indian Railways. The model name stands for broad gauge (W), Direct Current (C), Passenger traffic (P) engine, 2nd generation (2). They entered service in 1938. A single WCP-1 was built at England in 1938.

The WCP-2 served both passenger trains for over 40 years. With the introduction of more modern types of locomotives and 25 KV AC electrification, all were withdrawn by early 1970s. Today the single locomotive unit is in Nehru Science center at Worli Mumbai.

History
The electrification of the GIPR began in 1922. Powerful locomotives were required to transport the express trains on the mountain railway to overcome the Western Ghats. They also had to be able to reach speeds of 85 miles an hour (137 km/h) - a very high speed at that time, which was not even the case with the E 501 and 502 of the Paris-Orleans Railway had been requested. Three test locomotives were therefore ordered from different manufacturers in order to be able to select a suitable design for the series. The tender and evaluation was monitored by the UK electrical engineering firm Merz & McLellan in London. GIPR ordered the following test locomotives in 1923.

The first WCP-1 was quite successful so in 1938, a single replica locomotive with the number 4025 was ordered, which had the same construction as the other locomotives, but was nevertheless classified in a new series. The electrical equipment from Metrovick was installed in the halls of the SLM in Winterthur. After the voltage test, the locomotive body was lifted off the driving wheels and the bogies and the engines removed. For transport, it was placed on two special bogies of a SBB flat bed wagon and shipped on the rails to Antwerp, where it was loaded onto the cargo ship to India. In Bombay, the locomotive box was put back on the undercarriage and brought on its own wheels to the main workshop in GIPR, where the locomotive was fully assembled and then went into operation.

The locomotive remained in use until the 1980s and was given after being condemned at the Nehru Science Center in Bombay.

Specification

The locomotive has three individually driven axles, a two-axle bogie at one end and a single axle at the other end of the locomotive. The Winterthur bogie had a pivoting pivot that was centered with springs. The individual running axle was combined with the neighboring driving axle to form a Java bogie, which is why the locomotive had the axle sequence 2’Bo (A1) and not, as often written, 2’Co1.

Two drive motors each drive a drive axle via an SLM universal drive. The engines were arranged high in the engine room, which on the one hand gave the locomotive a favorable center of gravity, and on the other hand it protected it from damage during the frequent floods in Bombay when traveling through water. The engines could be removed laterally through maintenance openings in the lower area of the machine room side wall.

The locomotive's box extended the entire length of the frame. The engine room between the two cabs was divided into three rooms. The brake equipment with vacuum pump and the compressor with air reservoir were in the first room, the switchgear for the electro-pneumatic control was in the second room and the starting resistors were in the third room. The approach took place with all six traction motors connected in series, then two groups of three motors in series and finally three groups with two motors in series were formed. Two field weakening levels were available in each group, so that the locomotive had a total of nine continuous driving stages.

See also
Rail transport in India#History
Indian Railways
Locomotives of India
Rail transport in India

References

Books

External links
http://www.irfca.org/faq/faq-specs.html#WCP-2

India railway fan club

Electric locomotives of India
1500 V DC locomotives
Railway locomotives introduced in 1928
5 ft 6 in gauge locomotives
SLM locomotives